A hill figure is a large visual representation created by cutting into a steep hillside and revealing the underlying geology. It is a type of geoglyph usually designed to be seen from afar rather than above. In some cases trenches are dug and rubble made from material brighter than the natural bedrock is placed into them. The new material is often chalk, a soft and white form of limestone, leading to the alternative name of chalk figure for this form of art.

Hill figures cut in grass are a phenomenon especially seen in England, where examples include the Cerne Abbas Giant, the Uffington White Horse, and the Long Man of Wilmington, as well as the "lost" carvings at Cambridge, Oxford and Plymouth Hoe. From the 18th century onwards, many further ones were added. Many figures long thought to be ancient have been found to be relatively recent when subjected to modern archaeological scrutiny, at least in their current form. Only the Uffington White Horse appears to retain a prehistoric shape, while the Cerne Abbas Giant may be prehistoric, Romano-British, or Early Modern. Nevertheless, these figures, and their possible lost companions, have been iconic in the English people's conception of their past.

History
The creation of hill figures has been practised since prehistory and can include human and animal forms. Cutting of horses is common, as well as more abstract symbols and, in the modern era, advertising brands.

The reasons for the creation for the figures are varied and obscure. The Uffington Horse probably held political significance, since the figure dominates the valley below. It probably dates to the British Iron Age since coins have been found exhibiting the symbol. The Cerne Abbas Giant might have been a work of political satire likely of the Early Modern period. Wiltshire is a county with a large number of White Horses; 14 have been recorded. The figures are usually created by the cutting away of the top layer of relatively poor soil on suitable hillsides. This exposes the white chalk beneath, which contrasts well with the short green hill grass, and the image is clearly visible for a considerable distance. Although most of the figures are of great age, many are relatively new. Devizes in Wiltshire created a large white horse for the 2000 Millennium celebrations and in October 2009 celebrated this with an aerial photo of volunteers making the figure 10 for an aerial photo.

Figures must be maintained to remain visible, and local people often work regularly to restore or maintain a local landmark, though two cuttings of military badges at Sutton Mandeville, Wiltshire, are becoming lost. A map of Australia at Compton Chamberlayne, Wiltshire, was lost in 2005.

Similar pictures exist elsewhere in the world, notably the far larger Nazca Lines in Peru, which are on flat land but visible from hills in the area. However, these were made in desert terrain rather than on grassy hillsides, so have not become overgrown and thus have survived much longer without maintenance. The Nazca Lines were formed by removing loose stones from the lines to expose the whiteish underlying soil, which is not itself dug.

Terminology
Geoglyph is the usual term for structures carved into or otherwise made from rock formations.

In 1949, Morris Marples "half-humorously" coined the words "leucippotomy for the cutting of white horses and gigantotomy for the cutting of giants on rare occasions". Though neither word appears in the Oxford English Dictionary, the terms occasionally appear in print.

Construction
Until recently, three methods were used to construct white hill figures.

The stripping method: where the soil is thin, the turf or soil is stripped away to expose the chalk underneath. This produces quick results but the figure needs regular maintenance, as it would soon become overgrown. This was a practice for hill figures but not as much for horses. The Laverstock Panda at Laverstock near Salisbury, Wiltshire was constructed this way in 1968 and is now lost. Traces of figures of this type are not usually found after the figure is overgrown.
The covering method: rocks are placed on top of the turf. This method is normally used when there is no underlying chalk, the chalk is deep or tools are not available. The maintenance for these figures is very high. There are several examples, such as the Woolbury White Horse in Hampshire. This method leaves no trace of the figure's existence when overgrown, as is the case of the lost Fovant Badges in Wiltshire.
The trenching method, which is by far the most common method of hill figure construction. The underlying chalk where some white horses are constructed is not near the surface, so a trench is dug and chalk from another site is used to fill it. The Uffington White Horse in Oxfordshire is the prime example of this method. This method is invasive in the hillside and allows traces of the figure to be seen even when the figure has been overgrown for many years, an example being the original Devizes White Horse, cut in 1845 and lost sometime in the mid 20th century, but rediscovered when traces reappeared.

The biggest threat to white horses and other hill figures is natural vegetation covering the figures. In the case of chalk figures, natural vegetation encroaches from the edges and can grow on soil washed onto the figure by rain. Water erosion can also be a problem on steep or gentle slopes, because rain can wash the chalk off the horse, or soil onto the horse. Larger horses are more susceptible to this. If chalk is washed off the horse, the horse gradually creeps down the slope; or if soil is washed onto the horse, it collects onto the lower edges and the horse gradually climbs up the slope. A solution is to provide drainage, either using run-off drains, as at Uffington White Horse, or a french ditch.

Human figures
While presumed to be of prehistoric origin, surviving examples may have been created only within the last four hundred years. Of these giants only two survive: one near the village of Cerne Abbas, to the north of Dorchester, in Dorset and one at Wilmington, Long Man civil parish in the Wealden District of East Sussex. Examples located at Oxford, Cambridge, and on Plymouth Hoe can no longer be seen with the naked eye.

The Osmington White Horse carries a rider (King George III) but is not considered an example of gigantotomy due to the name of the figure referring to the horse.

Cerne Abbas Giant

The figure is carved into the side of a steep hill, and is best viewed from the opposite side of the valley or from the air. In his right hand the giant holds a knobbled club  in length.

Its history cannot be traced back further than the late 17th century, making an origin during the Celtic, Roman or even Early Medieval periods difficult to prove. Above and to the right of the Giant's head is an earthwork known as the "Trendle", or "Frying Pan". Medieval writings refer to this location as "Trendle Hill", but make no mention of the giant, leading to the conclusion that it was probably only carved about 400 years ago. In contrast, the Uffington White Horse an unquestionably prehistoric hill figure on the Berkshire Downs was noticed and recorded by medieval authors. In 2021, a sediment analysis by the National Trust indicated an origin in the date range of 700 CE to 1100 CE, surprising historians who did not expect it to be medieval.

In 2008, overgrowth forced a re-chalking of the giant, with 17 tonnes of new chalk being poured in and tamped down by hand.

Long Man of Wilmington

The earliest record was made by the surveyor John Rowley in the year 1710. This drawing suggests that the original figure was a shadow or indentation in the grass, rather than the solid outline of a human figure. The staves were not depicted as a rake and scythe as was once thought, and the head was a helmet shape. Sir William Borrow's drawing of 1766 shows the figure holding a rake and a scythe, both shorter than the staves.

Before 1874, the Long Man's outline was only visible in certain light conditions as a different shade in the hillside grass, or after a light fall of snow. In that year an antiquarian marked out the outline with yellow bricks, later cemented together. It has been claimed that the 'restoration' process distorted the position of the feet, an assertion backed up by several who had been familiar with the figure before 1874, and also by later resistivity surveys.
It has also been suggested that it removed the Long Man's genitalia, though there is no historical or archaeological evidence which supports that claim.  A wide range of dates of origin have been proposed for the Long Man, but more recent archaeological work done by the University of Reading suggests that the figure dates from the 16th or 17th century AD.

Plymouth Hoe giants

Until the early 17th century large outline images of the two giants, perhaps Gog and Magog (or Goemagot and Corineus) had for a long time been cut into the turf of Plymouth Hoe exposing the white limestone beneath.  An early and explicit reference was made to them by Richard Carew in 1602.  At one time these figures were periodically re-cut and cleaned but no trace of them remains today.

Firle Corn

Firle Corn in Firle, Sussex is a nearly-lost hill figure which can be seen with the aid of infrared photography. Now looking more like a small ear of corn or a strange weapon than a human figure, there is a legend suggesting that a giant called Gill was once cut on this same hill and that he was considered an adversary of the Long Man of Wilmington not far away.  According to one story, the giant on Firle Beacon threw his hammer at the Wilmington giant and killed him, and that the figure on the hillside marks the place where his body fell.

Homer Simpson
As a publicity stunt for the opening of The Simpsons Movie on 16 July 2007, a giant Homer Simpson brandishing a doughnut was outlined in water-based biodegradable paint to the left of the Cerne Abbas Giant. This act angered local neopagans, who pledged to perform "rain magic" to wash the figure away.

Horse figures

There are 16 known white horse hill figures in the UK, or 17 including the painted one at Cleadon Hills.

The Luzley White Horse near Mossley, cut in 1981, was neglected in 1992 after its creator died, but was not completely lost for some time.

Eight of the current white horses, and at least five of the lost figures, are in Wiltshire. The white horse is now generally considered a symbol of Wiltshire. An 1872 sketch of the Cherhill White Horse was later featured in the unofficial flag of Wiltshire, the White Horse Flag. It was designed after its designer, Chrys Fear, decided the white horse symbol had a stronger connection to Wiltshire than the Great Bustard on the official flag. Additionally, for the third millennium, it was proposed that a white horse should feature on one of the surrounding hills in Devizes (it became the Devizes Millennium White Horse). Smaller white horses now feature in Wiltshire, such as a replica of the Devizes White Horse in a Devizes primary school and two proposed white horses to feature on a roundabout in Marlborough (both towns already have larger white horses). Liddington Hill near Swindon is the latest location in Wiltshire to have a proposed white horse, in the early 2000s, although the idea was abandoned.

List of UK figures

Current figures

Lost figures

Possible figures

List of international figures

The horses in Cockington Green, Georgia and Juárez are all based on the style of or direct copies of the Uffington White Horse.

Lost figures
Since hill figures must be maintained by the removal of regrown turf, only those that motivate the local populace to look after them survive. Surviving ancient figures all have an associated fair or ceremony that involves maintaining them.

Unmaintained figures gradually fade away. Firle Corn at Firle Beacon, Sussex could be a lost figure. Its existence is suggested by infrared photography. If it is a lost figure, its age is uncertain, and unlikely prehistoric in origin, as only one figure in the UK has been shown to be of this age, the Uffington White Horse.

There have been horses at Devizes and Pewsey, both in Wiltshire, that have been lost but replaced by new ones in the 20th century.

Influence on other art forms
The white horses of Wiltshire, of which there are currently nine, have inspired other sculptures in the county. Julive Livsey's sculpture White Horse Pacified (1987) in Shaw, Swindon was inspired by the white horses. Furthermore, Charlotte Moreton created the steel sculpture White Horse (2010) for Solstice Park, Amesbury, taking influence from the white horses. A roundabout in Westbury, which features views of Westbury White Horse, features a canvas of the horse, with the horse also featuring in a mosaic in the town. When the county was choosing an official flag in 2006–07, a suggested nominee was the "White Horse Flag", featuring Cherhill White Horse. The Town Flag of Pewsey, registered in September 2014, features the Pewsey White Horse at its centre.

Some of the most significant figures

England
In England there are at least fifty landscape figures, the majority of which are in the south. (The phrase "forensic photo", relating to a few lost figures, refers to photos taken with appropriate filters, in optimum lighting, often at times of severe drought or snow covering, to bring out features no longer normally visible.)

Alton Barnes white horse, Wiltshire (1812)
Broad Town White Horse, Wiltshire (1864)
Battle of Britain Memorial, Capel-le-Ferne, Kent (1993)
Bulford Kiwi, carved by New Zealand soldiers at Sling Camp in 1919
Cerne Abbas Giant, Dorset (before 1694, possibly ancient)
Cleadon white horse, Cleadon, Tyne and Wear (before 1887)
Old Devizes White Horse, or the Snobs' horse, Wiltshire (1845)
New Devizes White Horse, Wiltshire (1999)
Cherhill White Horse, Wiltshire (1780)
Compton Chamberlayne Australia map, Wiltshire (1916, photographed, lost 2005)
Folkestone White Horse, Kent (2003)
 Fovant badges, Wiltshire (various dates from 1916)
Hackpen or Broad Hinton or Winterbourne Bassett white horse, Wiltshire (1838?)
Hindhead white horse, Surrey (before 1913, photographed, now lost)
Ham Hill or Inkpen white horse, Wiltshire (1865–1877)
Kilburn White Horse, Yorkshire (1857)
Lenham Cross, Kent (1922)
Old Litlington (Alfriston) white horse, Sussex (c.1838)
New Litlington White Horse, Sussex (1925)
Marlborough White Horse (or Preshute White Horse), Wiltshire (1804)

Osmington White Horse, Dorset (c.1808)
Old Pewsey White Horse, Wiltshire (1785)
New Pewsey white horse, Wiltshire (1937)
Red Horse of Tysoe (before 1607, forensic photos of first four editions, fifth extant 1914, now lost)
Rockley white horse, Wiltshire (discovered 1948, photographed, now lost)
Shoreham, Kent memorial cross, Kent (1920)
Sutton Mandeville military badges, Wiltshire (1916, photographed, to be lost soon)
Tan Hill white horse, Wiltshire (extant 1975, forensic photo, now lost)
Uffington White Horse (Bronze Age, 1400 BC to 600 BC)
Westbury White Horse (in the parish of Bratton), Wiltshire (before 1742)
Whipsnade white lion, on the Dunstable Downs, Bedfordshire (1931)
The Whitehawk hawk, in Sheepcote Valley on the South Downs, east of Brighton, Sussex (2001)
Whiteleaf Cross, Monks Risborough, Buckinghamshire (earliest ref. 1742) 
Wye Crown, Kent (1902)
Long Man of Wilmington, Sussex (c. 16th century)

Scotland
Mormond White Stag, on the other side of the hill from the Mormond Horse.

Gallery

Drawings gallery

In fiction
The Ballad of the White Horse by G. K. Chesterton
The Scouring of the White Horse by Tom Hughes
Sun Horse, Moon Horse by Rosemary Sutcliff
Witch Hill by Marcus Sedgwick
Find the White Horse by Dick King-Smith
A Hat Full of Sky by Terry Pratchett
The Dark Is Rising Sequence by Susan Cooper
The Sandman by Neil Gaiman
The Language of Bees by Laurie R. King
The Westbury White Horse is mentioned in the novel The English Patient by Michael Ondaatje, but was not featured in the film of the novel.

In film
 Alton Barnes White Horse appears, very briefly, in the music video for Staying Out for the Summer by Dodgy.
 Cherhill White Horse features in the music video for Doctorin' the Tardis by The Timelords.
 Uffington White Horse (in animated form) features in the music video for Sonnet by The Verve.
 Westbury White Horse features in the music video for Breathe by Midge Ure, alongside a temporary figure of the sun.

See also
Anglo-Saxon paganism
Atacama Giant
C-Rock, near Columbia University, New York City
English folklore
Flag of Wiltshire
Gog Magog Hills, an unverified claim of geoglyphs
Hillside letters, a similar type of geoglyph common in the Western U.S., but using letters instead of figures
Nazca Lines, geoglyphs etched into the Nazca Plain
Richard Long (artist)
Vale of the Red Horse, the location for a possible collection of 1-6 hill figures of a horse in Warwickhire
White horse (mythology)

References

Bibliography

Mapping

 Alton Barnes white horse, 
 Broad Town white horse, 
 Battle of Britain Memorial, 
 Bulford Kiwi, 
 Cerne Abbas giant, 
 New Devizes white horse, 
 Cherhill white horse, 
 Folkestone white horse, 
 Fovant Down badges, 
 Hackpen white horse, 
 Kilburn white horse, 
 Lenham Memorial Cross, 
 New Litlington White Horse, 

 Marlborough white horse, 
 Osmington white horse, 
 new Pewsey white horse, 
 Uffington white horse, 
 Westbury white horse, 
 Whipsnade Zoo white lion, 
 Whitehawk hawk, 
 Whiteleaf Cross, 
 Wye Crown, 
 Long Man of Wilmington,

External links

The Hillfigure Homepage
Aerial Images of UK (England & Wales): Hill Figures
English Heritage Monument Class Description
Wiltshire White Horses
Wiltshire's Horses
Australian badges in Wiltshire (Fovant)
Waimate White Horse

Types of monuments and memorials
Archaeology of the United Kingdom
 
Public art
Chalk